Lhota pod Libčany is a municipality and village in Hradec Králové District in the Hradec Králové Region of the Czech Republic. It has about 1,000 inhabitants.

Administrative parts
The village of Hubenice is an administrative part of Lhota pod Libčany.

Geography
It lies in a flat agricultural landscape of the East Elbe Table.

References

External links

Villages in Hradec Králové District